The London and South East Division Rugby Football Union is a rugby union governing body for London and South East England and is part of the Rugby Football Union.

Constituent Bodies

Eastern Counties
Essex
Hampshire
Hertfordshire
Middlesex
Surrey
Sussex

Leagues
It organises the following leagues:

London & South East Premier (tier 5)
London 1 North (6)
London 1 South (6)
London 2 North East (7)
London 2 North West (7)
London 2 South East (7)
London 2 South West (7)
London 3 Eastern Counties (8)
London 3 Essex (8)
London 3 North West (8)
London 3 South East (8)
London 3 South West (8)
Eastern Counties 1 (9)
Eastern Counties 2 (10)
Essex 1 (9)
Hampshire Premier (9)
Hampshire 1 (10)
Hampshire 2 (11)
Herts/Middlesex 1 (9)
Herts/Middlesex 2 (10)
Kent 1 (9)
Kent 2 (10)
Surrey 1 (9)
Surrey 2 (10)
Surrey 3 (11)
Surrey 4 (12)
Sussex 1 (9)

Cups
Clubs also take part in the following national cup competitions:
RFU Intermediate Cup
RFU Senior Vase
RFU Junior Vase

Discontinued competitions

Eastern Counties 4
Eastern Counties 5
Eastern Counties 6
Essex 2
Essex 3
Herts/Middlesex 3
Herts/Middlesex 4
Herts/Middlesex 5
Hertfordshire 1
Hertfordshire 2
Middlesex 1
Middlesex 2 
Middlesex 3 
Middlesex 4 
Middlesex 5 
Surrey 5
Sussex 2
Sussex 3

See also
Midland Division
Northern Division
South West Division
English rugby union system

References

External links
RFU London & South East

Rugby union governing bodies in England
Rugby union in London